Simon Wheeldon (born August 30, 1966) is a former ice hockey player. He played for the New York Rangers and Winnipeg Jets.

Career statistics

Regular season and playoffs

International

Awards
 WHL West Second All-Star Team – 1985 & 1986

External links

1966 births
Living people
Baltimore Skipjacks players
Canadian ice hockey centres
Colorado Rangers players
Denver Rangers players
Edmonton Oilers draft picks
Flint Spirits players
Ice hockey people from Vancouver
Ice hockey players at the 1998 Winter Olympics
Ice hockey players at the 2002 Winter Olympics
Kelowna Buckaroos players
Moncton Hawks players
München Barons players
New Haven Nighthawks players
New York Rangers players
Nova Scotia Oilers players
Olympic ice hockey players of Austria
VEU Feldkirch players
Victoria Cougars (WHL) players
Winnipeg Jets (1979–1996) players